Euarestella abyssinica is a species of tephritid or fruit flies in the genus Euarestella of the family Tephritidae.

Distribution
Ethiopia.

References

Tephritinae
Insects described in 1937
Diptera of Africa